Nan Kelley (born Nan Sumrall, born c. 1965) is a former Miss Mississippi (1985) who later became a host and correspondent for the Great American Country (GAC) cable television network.

Early life and career
A native of Hattiesburg, Mississippi, Kelley initially finished first runner-up in the 1985 Miss Mississippi pageant to Susan Akin, but became Miss Mississippi when Akin was named Miss America that year. Following her service, she received her degree from college in Communications, and then worked as an entertainer for the United States Department of Defense. While at the Defense Department, Kelley entertained troops in the Middle East, Europe, Alaska, and the Caribbean.

Move to Nashville
Kelley moved to Nashville, Tennessee where she performed at Opryland. Later, she worked for record producer Blake Mevis, the first producer for 2006 Country Music Hall of Fame inductee George Strait. After spending time in the recording studio and on stage, Kelley moved to broadcasting working for Dick Clark Productions as a producer for Prime Time Country on The Nashville Network (Spike TV since August 2003.) Later Kelley worked as a host for the Shop At Home Network before joining GAC as host of Grand Ole Opry Live on October 4, 2003.

Work at GAC
In addition to hosting Grand Ole Opry Live, Kelley also hosts GAC's Top 20 Country Countdown which deals with the top twenty videos in country music on the network for a particular week that is voted on by GAC viewers. She also hosts a show called My Music Mix where they interview an artist's favorite music video, both of their own and others. When Hurricane Katrina hit Alabama, Louisiana, and Mississippi on August 29, 2005, Kelley hosted a benefit concert that was simulcast on two other E.W. Scripps' television networks (DIY Network and Fine Living) titled Country Reaches Out: An Opry and GAC Benefit for the American Red Cross.

Personal life
Kelley is married to Grammy-nominated record producer Charlie Kelley and lives in Nashville.  The couple owns two dogs.

Cancer Diagnosis
Nan Kelley revealed in May 2008 on GAC's Top 20 Country Countdown that she has cancer. At the end of the show she made the following announcement:

"Now before we leave you today, I wanted to take a personal moment and share something with you that's happening in my life, because you are part of it here each week on GAC. Over the next few months I'll be receiving treatments for Hodgkins Lymphoma. My prognosis is very good and I should be just fine on the other side. But I may not be here some days and if I am here I may not be my super perky self and definitely my hair style will change. If you happen to be going through this at this time in your life, or maybe you have a friend or family member going through it right now, I wanted to share this with you in hopes that we can help each other. Thanks for listening and as always, we thank you for watching. We can’t do this without you and I mean it. I'll see you real soon."

From May 2008 to August 2008, Nan was absent from the GAC Top 20 Country Countdown for most of the episodes, making a complete return to the show in September 2008. Nan has been wearing a wig on the show. On November 21, 2008, Nan announced on GAC's Top 20 Country Countdown that she has made a complete recovery from her cancer. In January 2009, she premiered her new hairstyle without the wig.

References
GAC TV profile

External links

Miss Mississippi 1985 photograph; accessed March 9, 2007.

1960s births
Living people
American television personalities
Miss America 1980s delegates
People from Hattiesburg, Mississippi
Miss Mississippi winners